Federal Public Service Mobility and Transport, is a Federal Public Service of Belgium.

Its head office is located at the City Atrium in the Brussels Northern Quarter business district.

It was created by Royal Order on 20 November 2001, as part of the plans of the Verhofstadt I Government to modernise the federal administration. It is responsible for preparing and implementing transportation policies.

The agency's Air Accident Investigation Unit (AAIU) investigates aircraft accidents and incidents. The agency's Railway Accident and Incident Investigation Unit investigates rail accidents. The Federal Bureau for the Investigation of Maritime Accidents (FEBIMA) investigates maritime accidents.

Organisation

The FPS Mobility and Transport is currently organised into four Directorates-General:
the Directorate-General Sustainable Mobility and Rail Policy
the Directorate-General Road Transport and Road Safety
 Vehicle registration service (DIV)
the Directorate-General Shipping (DGS)
the Belgian Civil Aviation Authority (BCAA)

It is also responsible for several government agencies, such as the Belgian Institute for Traffic Safety, and autonomous public companies, namely the National Railway Company of Belgium, the Brussels Airport Company and Skeyes.

References

External links

 Website of the FPS Mobility and Transport Belgium

Federal departments and agencies of Belgium
Transport ministries
Ministries established in 2001
2001 establishments in Belgium
Rail accident investigators
Organizations investigating aviation accidents and incidents
Transport organisations based in Belgium